Collartida is a genus of assassin bugs.  The genus was thought to be restricted to Africa, Israel and the Canary Islands, but a newly discovered species was recently reported from Taiwan (in 2010). The genus now consists of 10 species.

List of species
Collartida anophthalma Español & Ribes, 1983
Collartida microphthalma Villiers, 1961
Collartida nigella Linnavuori, 1974
Collartida oculata Villiers, 1949
Collartida peregrina Rédei & Tsai, 2010
Collartida pericarti Villiers, 1968
Collartida phryne Linnavuori, 1973
Collartida serapis Linnavuori, 1974
Collartida tanausu Ribes, Oromi, & Ribes, 1998
Collartida zephyrus Linnavuori, 1974

References

Reduviidae
Cimicomorpha genera
Insects of Africa
Arthropods of Israel